Peter Mieg (5 September 1906 – 7 December 1990) was a Swiss composer, painter and journalist.

Biography

Mieg was born in Lenzburg where he spent almost all his life. He studied art history, archaeology, music history as well as French and German Literature in Zurich, Basel and Paris from 1927 to 1933. In the early 1930s Mieg became a journalist writing articles about art, music and literature for newspapers such as the Basler Nachrichten, the Weltwoche and the Badener Tagblatt.

Between 1933 and 1939 he became friends with the conductor and patron Paul Sacher and the composers Béla Bartók, Igor Stravinsky, Arthur Honegger and Bohuslav Martinu.

Compositions

In the 1940s Mieg completed his musical formation with Frank Martin. His first important works were written in the 1950s in a very personal neoclassicism. From that time on he was commissioned by the Tonhalle Orchester Zürich (Symphony, 1958), the Zurich Chamber Orchestra (Concerto per clavicembalo e orchestra da camera, 1953, Concerto Veneziano, 1955, the Concerto for oboe and orchestra, 1957, the Concerto pour piano à quatre mains et orchestre à cordes, 1980), the Lucerne Festival Strings (Triple concerto dans le goût italien, 1978) and many others.

Mieg wrote some 135 compositions, including several concertos (for piano, for violin, for flute, for 2 flutes, for harp, for cello, for piano and cello), a lot of chamber music and piano music (5 piano sonatas).

Painting

In 1961 Mieg exhibited his gouaches for the first time. They mostly represent still life and landscapes. He had been painting since his childhood.

Family

Peter Mieg's grandaunt was Swiss composer and singer Fanny Hünerwadel (1826-1854).

Bibliography

 Anna Kardos, Tom Hellat: Auf der Suche nach dem eigenen Klang – Der Komponist, Publizist und Maler Peter Mieg, Hier und Jetzt, Baden 2016, 
 Silvia Kind: Peter Mieg, in: Monologue. Washington DC, 2001, p. 226–235.
 Michael Schneider: Der Komponist Peter Mieg: Leben – Werk – Rezeption (The composer Peter Mieg: Life - Work - Reception). Amadeus, Winterthur 1995, .
 Brigitte Morach-Müller (editor): Peter Mieg als Maler (Peter Mieg as a painter). With articles by Emil Maurer, Peter Mieg, Jean Rudolf von Salis and Edmond de Stoutz. Kromer, Lenzburg, 1984.
 Reni Mertens & Walter Marti: Der Komponist, Maler, Schriftsteller und Journalist Peter Mieg (The composer, painter and journalist Peter Mieg). Film about Peter Mieg, 1980
 Uli Däster, Walter Kläy and Walter Labhart (editors): Peter Mieg. Eine Monographie (Peter Mieg. A Monography). Sauerländer, Aarau and Frankfurt 1976, .

External links
 Official website
 Peter Mieg on the website of musinfo.ch
 Peter Mieg on YouTube

1906 births
1990 deaths
People from Lenzburg
Swiss Calvinist and Reformed Christians
20th-century classical composers
Swiss classical composers
20th-century Swiss painters
Swiss male painters
Swiss male classical composers
20th-century male musicians
20th-century Swiss male artists
20th-century Swiss composers